Namma Samsara is a 1971 Indian Kannada language drama film written and directed by Siddalingaiah. It stars Rajkumar and Bharathi. The film was released under Srikanth & Srikanth Enterprises banner and produced by Srikanth Nahata and Srikanth Patel.

Cast 
 Rajkumar 
 Bharathi 
 B. V. Radha
 Rajashankar
 Advani Lakshmi Devi
 Balakrishna
 Padmanjali
 Dinesh
 Papamma

Soundtrack 
The music of the film was composed by M. Ranga Rao and lyrics for the soundtrack written by Chi. Udaya Shankar and R. N. Jayagopal. The title song sung by P. B. Sreenivas, P. Susheela and S. P. Balasubrahmanyam was hugely popular and considered one of the evergreen songs in Kannada cinema.

Track list

See also
 Kannada films of 1971

References

External links 
 

1971 films
1970s Kannada-language films
Indian black-and-white films
Indian drama films
Films scored by M. Ranga Rao
Films directed by Siddalingaiah